In Christian theology, conditional election is the belief that God chooses for eternal salvation those whom he foresees will have faith in Christ.  This belief emphasizes the importance of a person's free will.  The counter-view is known as unconditional election, and is the belief that God chooses whomever he will, based solely on his purposes and apart from an individual's free will.  It has long been an issue in Calvinist–Arminian debate.

Arminian doctrine

The doctrine of conditional election is most often associated with the Arminian churches. The Arminians have defended their belief against the doctrine of other Calvinist churches since the early 17th century when they submitted the following statement of doctrine to the Reformed Churches of the Low Countries:

See also 
Corporate election, an alternative Arminian view
Conditional security, a related doctrine
Predestination

References 

Salvation in Protestantism
Arminianism
Christian terminology